Nkusi Hydroelectric Power Station, also referred to as Nkusi Power Station, is a  hydroelectric power station in the  Western Region of Uganda.

Location
The power station is located across River Nkusi at the border between Hoima District and  Kibaale District. This location is near Nguse village, where Nkusi Falls and the mouth of the river are located.
in Kibaale District. The river, that forms the boundary between the two districts, meanders before it gushes over the falls into Lake Albert. The project area is found in both Kibale and Hoima districts. The coordinates of the power house are: 01°07'10.0"N,  30°40'05.0"E (Latitude:1.119444; Longitude:30.668056).

Overview
It was developed by its owner, PA Technical Services, who operate it after construction was completed.

Due to the location on steep cliffs, along the lake shore, the approach to the power station is via watercraft (barge or boat) on Lake Albert. To access the water intake part of the station, there is a suspended footpath navigating the vertical cliffs over Nkusi Falls. Parts of the power station is accessed via a tunnel. The power generated is evacuated to a 132/33 kV substation near the power station, for integration into the national power grid.

Financing and construction timetable
The budgeted cost of construction is US$23 million. Construction began in June 2015, and the completed power station was commissioned on 11 October 2018.

See also
 List of power stations in Uganda

References

External links
Website of The Uganda Electricity Transmission Company Limited (UETCL)

Hydroelectric power stations in Uganda
Western Region, Uganda
Energy infrastructure in Uganda
Energy infrastructure completed in 2018
Hoima District
Kibaale District
2018 establishments in Uganda